Sodium pyruvate is a salt of the conjugate anion form of pyruvic acid, known as pyruvate. It is commonly added to cell culture media as an additional source of energy, but may also have protective effects against hydrogen peroxide. This was reported by Giandomenico et al. and has been confirmed by several independent groups.

Due to pyruvate being an intermediate in many pathways for metabolism including glycolysis, sodium pyruvate has been used in many experiments involving cell cultures to provide more energy. In adipocytes it was found that sodium pyruvate promoted increased uptake of insulin-mediated glucose. In the body, one way in which sodium pyruvate provides energy to cells is through pyruvate conversion to acetyl-CoA which then can enter the TCA cycle which produces energy and is linked to other energy producing processes.

Along with having antioxidant properties and energy producing effects, sodium pyruvate has the ability to cross the blood-brain barrier and is used in several studies on brain injury because of these characteristics.

References

Organic sodium salts